Extrapyramidal can refer to:
 Extrapyramidal system
 Extrapyramidal symptoms